Pirangut is a census town in Mulshi taluka of Pune district in the Indian state of Maharashtra.

Demographics
Pirangut,  had a population of 14174. Males constitute 52% of the population and females 48%.  Bhare (1 KM), Kasaramboli (3 KM), Mulkhed (4 KM), Lavale (4 KM) are the nearby Villages to Pirangut.

Industry
There is an industrial park established by MIDC in the town where  many manufacturing and processing companies are located. Most of these are located near Ghotawade Phata. Some of the prominent companies include Vulkan Technologies, Bobst India, Randack Fasteners, Phoenix Mecano India, Nalco India, and Champ Energy Ventures.

References

Cities and towns in Pune district